At the 1924 Summer Olympics in Paris, five diving events were contested. The competitions were held from Monday, 14 July 1924 to Sunday, 20 July 1924.

Medal summary
The events are labelled as 3 metre springboard, 10 metre platform and plain high diving by the International Olympic Committee, and appeared on the 1924 Official Report as plongeons du tremplin, plongeons de haut vol variés (men) or plongeons de haut vol ordinaires (women) and plongeons de haut vol ordinaires (men), respectively. The high diving and 10 metre platform events included dives from both 10 metre and 5 metre platforms, while the springboard events included dives from 3 metre and 1 metre springboards.

Men

Women

Participating nations
A total of 71 divers (45 men and 26 women) from 14 nations (men from 13 nations - women from 9 nations) competed at the Paris Games:

  (men:1 women:0)
  (men:0 women:3)
  (men:1 women:1)
  (men:1 women:1)
  (men:3 women:1)
  (men:6 women:0)
  (men:9 women:3)
  (men:5 women:6)
  (men:1 women:0)
  (men:2 women:2)
  (men:3 women:0)
  (men:7 women:4)
  (men:1 women:0)
  (men:5 women:5)

Medal table

References

 
1924 Summer Olympics events
1924
1924 in water sports